Śniadowo may refer to several places:

Śniadowo, Masovian Voivodeship (east-central Poland)
Śniadowo, Podlaskie Voivodeship (north-east Poland)
Śniadowo, Warmian-Masurian Voivodeship in Warmian-Masurian Voivodeship (north Poland)